Ancistrus caucanus is a species of catfish in the family Loricariidae. It is native to South America, where it was at one point thought to occur in the Cauca River basin in Colombia, for which it is named, although subsequent research suggested in 2013 that it is actually native to the Magdalena River basin, whereas its congener Ancistrus vericaucanus is the species native to the Cauca. The species reaches 5.2 cm (2 inches) SL. It is not to be confused with the similarly named species Lasiancistrus caucanus.

References 

caucanus
Fish described in 1943
Fish of South America